The 1999 Big East men's basketball tournament took place at Madison Square Garden in New York City. Its winner received the Big East Conference's automatic bid to the 1999 NCAA tournament. It is a single-elimination tournament with four rounds and the three highest seeds received byes in the first round. All 13 Big East teams were invited to participate. Connecticut finished with the best record in the regular season and was awarded the top seed.

Connecticut defeated St. John's in the final, 82–63 to earn its second consecutive Big East tournament championship, and fourth overall.

Bracket

Game summaries

First Round

Quarterfinals

Semifinals

Championship Game

Media coverage

Television
ESPN and ESPN2

Commentary teams
 Mike Tirico/Len Elmore – First Round (Providence–Georgetown, Rutgers–Pittsburgh); Quarterfinals (Miami (FL)–Georgetown, St. John's–Rutgers); Semifinals and Championship Game
 Dan Shulman/Bill Raftery – First Round (Notre Dame–Seton Hall, Syracuse–Boston College, Villanova–West Virginia); Quarterfinals (Connecticut–Seton Hall, Syracuse–Villanova)

Local Radio
{|
|-
| valign=top |

Awards
Dave Gavitt Trophy (Most Outstanding Player): Kevin Freeman (basketball), Connecticut

All-Tournament Team
 Erick Barkley, St. John's
 Khalid El-Amin, Connecticut
 Kevin Freeman, Connecticut
 Richard Hamilton, Connecticut
 Tim James, Miami
 Etan Thomas, Syracuse

References
General: 

Tournament
Big East men's basketball tournament
Basketball in New York City
College sports in New York City
Sports competitions in New York City
Sports in Manhattan
Big East men's basketball tournament
Big East men's basketball tournament
1990s in Manhattan
Madison Square Garden